Linnaeosicyos is a monotypic genus of flowering plants belonging to the family Cucurbitaceae. The only species is Linnaeosicyos amara .

It is native to the Dominican Republic.

The genus name of Linnaeosicyos is in honour of Carl Linnaeus (1707–1778). The Latin specific epithet of amara is derived from amarus meaning bitter.
Both genus and species were first described in Syst. Bot. Vol.33 on page 350 in 2008.

References

Cucurbitaceae
Monotypic Cucurbitaceae genera
Plants described in 2008
Flora of the Dominican Republic
Flora without expected TNC conservation status